Mariana Valencia (born 1984) is an American contemporary multidisciplinary artist. She was honoured as the "Outstanding Breakout Choreographer" at the 2018 Bessie Awards.

Early life 

Valencia is of Guatemalan descent, and was born and raised in Chicago during the 1980s. She received her BA from Hampshire College in Amherst, MA in 2006..

Career 
Mariana Valencia was a Whitney Biennial artist (2019) and a Movement Research Global Practice Sharing artist (2016/2017) Her work has been commissioned by the Baryshnikov Arts Center, The Chocolate Factory Theater, The Whitney Museum, and Performance Space New York. She is a founding member of the No Total reading group, and was the co-editor of Movement Research’s Critical Correspondence from 2016-2017. Mariana Valencia published two books, Bouquet and Album in 2019

Awards:  

 LMCC Extended Life Grant (2020)
 Bessie Award for Outstanding Breakout Choreographer (2018)
 Jerome Travel and Study Grant (2014-2015)
 The Foundation For Contemporary Arts Award to Artists Grant (2018)

Residencies:  

 AUNTS
 Chez Bushwick
 New York Live Arts
 ISSUE Project Room
 Brooklyn Arts Exchange
 Gibney Dance Center
 Movement Research
 Portland Institute for Contemporary Art
 Lower Manhattan Cultural Council

References 

1984 births
Living people
American people of Guatemalan descent
Bessie Award winners
American women choreographers
American choreographers
Hampshire College alumni
Artists from Chicago
21st-century American women writers
Dancers from Illinois
Writers from Chicago